The team endurance competition at the 2006 FEI World Equestrian Games was held on August 21, 2006.

Medalists

Complete results

3-rider teams

2-rider teams

External links
Official list of competitors
Official results

Endurance